Flying Regiment 3 ( or LeR 3) was a fighter aircraft regiment of the Finnish Air Force. The regiment took part in the Continuation War and the Lapland War.

Organization

Continuation War
No. 24 Squadron: fighter squadron
No. 26 Squadron: fighter squadron
No. 30 Squadron: fighter squadron
No. 32 Squadron: fighter squadron
No. 34 Squadron: fighter squadron

Lapland War
No. 34 Squadron: fighter squadron

After World War II, the regiment and its squadrons were re-organized and the new squadrons were renamed No. 31, and No. 33 Squadrons.

Aircraft
Messerschmitt Bf 109G-2 and G-6
Fiat G.50
Brewster Buffalo
Caudron-Renault C.R. 714
Hawker Hurricane Mk.I
Fokker D.XXI
Curtiss Hawk 75A-3 and A-4
Polikarpov I-153
Fokker C.X

Sources
Keskinen, Kalevi and Stenman, Kari: Finnish Air Force 1939-1945, Squadron/Signal publications, Carrollton, Texas, 1998, 

Regiments of the Finnish Air Force
Continuation War